French football club SC Bastia's 2002–03 season. Finished 12th place in league. Top scorer of the season, including 10 goals in 10 league matches have been Florian Maurice. Was eliminated to Coupe de France end of 64, the Coupe de la Ligue was able to be among the final 32 teams.

Transfers

In 
Summer
 Hassan Ahamada from Nantes
 Jocelyn Gourvennec from Rennes
 Samir Beloufa from G. Beerschot
 Anthar Yahia from Inter
 Florian Maurice from Celta Vigo
 Paul Essola from Créteil
 Benjamin Longue from Bastia B team
 Chaouki Ben Saada from Bastia B team
 Nicolas Alnoudji from Çaykur Rizespor
 Lilian Laslandes from Sunderland

Winter
 Laurent Batlles from Rennes
 Franck Silvestre from Montpellier
 Grégory Vignal from Liverpool
 Philippe Billy from Lecce

Out 
Summer
 Stéphane Odet to Beauvais
 Benjamin Ajiboye to EP Manosque
 Pierre Deblock to Auxerre
 Patrick Beneforti to Udinese
 Tony Vairelles to Lyon
 Damian Manso to Newell's Old Boys
 Daniel Popovic to NK Osijek
 Ishmael Addo to Maccabi Netanya
 Christophe Deguerville to free
 Ousmane Soumah to retired
 Lilian Nalis to Chievo

Winter
 Prince Daye to Club Africain
 Cyril Jeunechamp to Rennes
 Nicolas Dieuze to Toulouse
 Reynald Pedros to Maccabi Nazareth
 Fabrice Jau to St. Etienne
 Bernard Lambourde to Nancy
 Price Jolibois to Beauvais

Squad

Ligue 1

League table

Results summary

Results by round

Matches

Coupe de France

Coupe de la Ligue

Statistics

Top scorers

League top assists

References 

SC Bastia seasons
Bastia